Hughes de Beaumont (26 October 1874 – 6 June 1947) was a French painter and engraver of genre, portraits, landscapes and still lifes.

Beaumont studied under Albert Mangan and Theobald Chartran, and then under Gustave Moreau between 1892-1898.  He exhibited at the Salon of French artists in Paris 1892 and 1945; and at the Salon of the Societe Nationale des Beaux-Arts in Paris 1902. He has exhibited in Barcelona in 1912, Chicago in 1919, Wiesbaden in 1920, 1926 in Amsterdam, Brussels and 1928 in Tokyo. He was awarded the Légion d'honneur in 1930, and had two retrospective of his works were presented in Paris in 1927 and 1945. 

Beaumont produced work in the "intimiste" style which often depicted bourgeois settings. The term was coined by Édouard Vuillard who used it to describe his own style.  Other practitioners include Maurice Lobre, René Georges Hermann-Paul, Henri Matisse, Rene Prinet and Ernest Laurent. The Intimists first collective exhibition was shown at Henry Grave's galleries in 1905.  The exhibition included several works by Hughes de Beaumont.

He was known for his figure scenes and portraits of wealthy people, but also depicted landscapes and still lifes. Beaumont used a sombre palette for his still-life, usually consisting of a green and blue colour scheme, with the paint applied in an expressionistic way, on the small lightweight wooden panel. His impasto and broad brushstrokes gives the paintings a forceful and intense impact on the viewer. 

Beaumont's works have been exhibited and collected by major museums and galleries throughout the world, including:

 Aix-en-Provence - Musée Granet
 Boston - Museum of Fine Arts, Boston
 Cork - Crawford Art Gallery
 Glasgow - Kelvingrove Art Gallery and Museum
 Lyon - Museum of Fine Arts of Lyon
 Montpellier - Musée Fabre
 Paris - Musée du Luxembourg
 Tours - Musée des Beaux-Arts de Tours

References

19th-century French painters
19th-century French male artists
French male painters
20th-century French painters
20th-century French male artists
1874 births
1947 deaths